This is a list of members of the Académie française (French Academy) by seat number. The primary professions of the academicians are noted. The dates shown indicate the terms of the members, who generally serve for life. Some, however, were "excluded" during the reorganisations of 1803 and 1816 and at other times.

Seat 1
 Pierre Séguier, 1635–1643, politician and magistrate
 Claude Bazin de Bezons, 1643–1684, lawyer
 Nicolas Boileau-Despréaux, 1684–1711, poet
 Jean d'Estrées, 1711–1718, ecclesiastic and politician
 Marc-René d'Argenson, 1718–1721, politician
 Jean-Joseph Languet de Gergy, 1721–1753, ecclesiastic
 Georges-Louis Leclerc, Comte de Buffon, 1753–1788, essayist
 Félix Vicq-d'Azyr, 1788–1794, medical doctor
 François-Urbain Domergue, 1803–1810, grammarian
 Ange-François Fariau, 1810, poet and translator
 François-Auguste Parseval-Grandmaison, 1811–1834, poet
 Narcisse-Achille de Salvandy, 1835–1856, politician and historian
 Émile Augier, 1857–1889, poet and playwright
 Charles de Freycinet, 1890–1923, politician and physicist
 Charles Émile Picard, 1924–1941, mathematician
 Louis de Broglie, 1944–1987, physicist and mathematician
 Michel Debré, 1988–1996, politician
 François Furet, 1997, historian
 René Rémond, 1998–2007, historian
 Claude Dagens, elected 2008, ecclesiastic

Seat 2
 Valentin Conrart, 1634–1675, poet and grammarian
 Toussaint Rose, 1675–1701, orator
 Louis de Sacy, 1701–1727, lawyer
 Charles de Secondat, baron de Montesquieu, 1728–1755, magistrate and philosopher
 Jean-Baptiste Vivien de Châteaubrun, 1755–1775, poet and playwright
 François-Jean de Chastellux, 1775–1788, military officer
 Aimar-Charles-Marie de Nicolaï, 1788–1794, magistrate
 François de Neufchâteau, 1803–1828, politician and philologist
 Pierre-Antoine Lebrun, 1828–1873, politician and poet
 Alexandre Dumas, fils, 1874–1895, playwright and novelist
 André Theuriet, 1896–1907, novelist and poet
 Jean Richepin, 1908–1926, poet and novelist
 Émile Mâle, 1927–1954, art historian
 François Albert-Buisson, 1955–1961, magistrate and politician
 Marc Boegner, 1962–1970, ecclesiastic and theologian
 René de La Croix de Castries, 1972–1986, historian
 André Frossard, 1987–1995, essayist and journalist
 Hector Bianciotti, 1996–2012, novelist
 Dany Laferrière, elected 2013, writer

Seat 3
 Jacques de Serisay, 1634–1653, poet
 Paul-Philippe de Chaumont, 1654–1697, ecclesiastic
 Louis Cousin, 1697–1707, historian and journalist
 Jacques-Louis de Valon, marquis de Mimeure, 1707–1719, poet and translator
 Nicolas Gédoyn, 1719–1744, ecclesiastic
 François-Joachim de Pierre de Bernis, 1744–1794, ecclesiastic
 Roch-Ambroise Cucurron Sicard, 1803–1822, ecclesiastic and grammarian
 Denis-Luc Frayssinous, 1822–1841, ecclesiastic
 Étienne-Denis Pasquier, 1842–1862, politician
 Jules Armand Dufaure, 1863–1881, politician and lawyer
 Victor Cherbuliez, 1881–1899, novelist and playwright
 Émile Faguet, 1900–1916, literary critic and historian
 Georges Clemenceau, 1918–1929, politician and doctor
 André Chaumeix, 1930–1955, journalist and critic
 Jérôme Carcopino, 1955–1970, historian and archaeologist
 Roger Caillois, 1971–1978, essayist and sociologist
 Marguerite Yourcenar, 1980–1987, novelist and essayist
 Jean-Denis Bredin, 1989–2021, magistrate and essayist

Seat 4
 Jean Desmarets, 1634–1676, poet and novelist
 Jean-Jacques de Mesmes, 1676–1688, magistrate
 Jean Testu de Mauroy, 1688–1706, ecclesiastic
 Camille le Tellier de Louvois, 1706–1718, ecclesiastic
 Jean Baptiste Massillon, 1718–1742, ecclesiastic
 Louis Jules Mancini Mazarini, Duc de Nivernais, 1742–1798, politician and poet
 Gabriel-Marie Legouvé, 1803–1812, poet
 Alexandre-Vincent Pineux Duval, 1812–1842, poet and playwright
 Pierre-Simon Ballanche, 1842–1847, philosopher
 Jean Vatout, 1848, poet
 Alexis Guignard, comte de Saint-Priest, 1849–1851, politician and historian
 Antoine Pierre Berryer, 1852–1868, lawyer
 François-Joseph de Champagny, 1869–1882, historian
 Charles de Mazade, 1882–1893, poet and critic
 José-Maria de Heredia, 1894–1905, poet
 Maurice Barrès, 1906–1923, novelist and politician
 Louis Bertrand, 1925–1941, novelist and historian
 Jean Tharaud, 1946–1952, novelist
 Alphonse Juin, 1952–1967, soldier
 Pierre Emmanuel, 1968–1984, poet
 Jean Hamburger, 1985–1992, doctor and essayist
 Albert Decourtray, 1993–1994, ecclesiastic
 Jean-Marie Lustiger, 1995–2007, ecclesiastic
 Jean-Luc Marion, elected 2008, philosopher and academic

Seat 5
 Jean Ogier de Gombauld, 1634–1666, poet and playwright
 Paul Tallement le Jeune, 1666–1712, ecclesiastic
 Antoine Danchet, 1712–1748, playwright and poet
 Jean-Baptiste-Louis Gresset, 1748–1777, playwright
 Claude-François-Xavier Millot, 1777–1785, ecclesiastic
 André Morellet, 1785–1819, ecclesiastic
 Pierre-Édouard Lémontey, 1819–1826, politician and lawyer
 Joseph Fourier, 1826–1830, mathematician and physicist
 Victor Cousin, 1830–1867, politician and philosopher
 Jules Favre, 1867–1880, politician and lawyer
 Edmond Rousse, 1880–1906, lawyer
 Pierre de Ségur, 1907–1916, historian
 Robert de Flers, 1920–1927, playwright and journalist
 Louis Madelin, 1927–1956, historian
 Robert Kemp, 1956–1959, literary and dramatic critic
 René Huyghe, 1960–1997, art historian and essayist
 Georges Vedel, 1998–2002, magistrate
 Assia Djebar, 2005–2015, author
 Andreï Makine, elected 2016, author

Seat 6 
 François le Métel de Boisrobert, 1634–1662, ecclesiastic and poet
 Jean Regnault de Segrais, 1662–1701, poet and novelist
 Jean Galbert de Campistron, 1701–1723, playwright
 Philippe Néricault Destouches, 1723–1754, playwright and diplomat
 Louis de Boissy, 1754–1758, poet
 Jean-Baptiste de La Curne de Sainte-Palaye, 1758–1781, archaeologist
 Sébastien-Roch-Nicolas (Chamfort), 1781–1794, playwright and publisher
 Pierre Louis Roederer, 1803–1815, politician and lawyer
 Pierre Marc Gaston de Lévis, Duke of Lévis, 1816–1830, politician
 Philippe Paul, comte de Ségur, 1830–1873, diplomat and historian
 Charles de Viel-Castel, 1873–1887, diplomat
 Edmond Jurien de La Gravière, 1888–1892, admiral
 Ernest Lavisse, 1892–1922, historian
 Georges de Porto-Riche, 1923–1930, playwright and poet
 Pierre Benoît, 1931–1962, novelist
 Jean Paulhan, 1963–1968, literary and art critic
 Eugène Ionesco, 1970–1994, playwright
 Marc Fumaroli, 1995–2020, historian and essayist

Seat 7
 Jean Chapelain, 1634–1674, royal advisor
 Isaac de Benserade, 1674–1691, poet and playwright
 Étienne Pavillon, 1691–1705, lawyer and poet
 Fabio Brulart de Sillery, 1705–1714, ecclesiastic and poet
 Henri-Jacques Nompar de Caumont, duc de La Force, 1715–1726, economist
 Jean-Baptiste de Mirabaud, 1726–1760, translator
 Claude-Henri Watelet, 1760–1786, painter
 Michel-Jean Sedaine, 1786–1793, poet and playwright
 Jean-François Collin d'Harleville, 1803–1806, playwright and poet
 Pierre Daru, 1806–1829, politician and historian
 Alphonse de Lamartine, 1829–1869, politician and poet
 Émile Ollivier, 1870–1913, politician and lawyer
 Henri Bergson, 1914–1941, philosopher
 Édouard Le Roy, 1945–1954, philosopher and mathematician
 Henri Petiot (Daniel-Rops), 1955–1965, poet and novelist
 Pierre-Henri Simon, 1966–1972, literary historian and novelist
 André Roussin, 1973–1987, playwright
 Jacqueline de Romilly, 1988–2010, philologist and essayist
 Jules Hoffmann, elected 2012, biologist

Seat 8
 Claude de Malleville, 1634–1647, poet
 Jean Ballesdens, 1648–1675, lawyer
 Géraud de Cordemoy, 1675–1684, philosopher and historian
 Jean-Louis Bergeret, 1684–1694, lawyer
 Charles-Irénée Castel de Saint-Pierre, 1694–1743, ecclesiastic
 Pierre Louis Maupertuis, 1743–1759, astronomer
 Jean-Jacques Lefranc, Marquis de Pompignan, 1759–1784, magistrate and economist
 Jean-Sifrein Maury, 1784–1793, ecclesiastic and politician 
 Michel-Louis-Étienne Regnaud de Saint-Jean d'Angély, 1803–1814, politician and lawyer
 Pierre-Simon Laplace, 1816–1827, politician and mathematician
 Pierre Paul Royer-Collard, 1827–1845, politician
 Charles de Rémusat, 1846–1875, politician and philosopher
 Jules Simon, 1875–1896, politician and philosopher
 Adrien Albert Marie de Mun, 1897–1914, politician and soldier
 Alfred-Henri-Marie Baudrillart, 1918–1942, ecclesiastic and historian
 Octave Aubry, 1946–1946, historian and bureaucrat
 Édouard Herriot, 1946–1957, politician and literary historian
 Jean Rostand, 1959–1977, biologist and philosopher
 Michel Déon, 1978–2016, novelist
 Daniel Rondeau, elected 2019, writer and diplomat

Seat 9
 Nicolas Faret, 1634–1646, poet
 Pierre du Ryer, 1646–1658, playwright
 César d'Estrées, 1658–1714, ecclesiastic and politician
 Victor-Marie d'Estrées, 1715–1737, politician and soldier
 Charles Armand René de La Trémoille, 1738–1741, aristocrat
 Armand de Rohan-Soubise, 1741–1756, ecclesiastic
 Antoine de Montazet, 1756–1788, ecclesiastic
 Stanislas de Boufflers, 1788–1815, poet
 Pierre-Marie-François Baour-Lormian, 1815–1854, poet and playwright
 François Ponsard, 1855–1867, playwright
 Joseph Autran, 1868–1877, poet
 Victorien Sardou, 1877–1908, playwright
 Marcel Prévost, 1909–1941, novelist
 Émile Henriot, 1945–1961, novelist and literary critic
 Jean Guéhenno, 1962–1978, essayist
 Alain Decaux, 1979–2016, historian
 Patrick Grainville, elected 2018, novelist

Seat 10
 Antoine Godeau, 1634–1672, ecclesiastic and poet
 Esprit Fléchier, 1672–1710, ecclesiastic
 Henri de Nesmond, 1710–1727, ecclesiastic
 Jean-Jacques Amelot de Chaillou, 1727–1749, politician
 Charles Louis Auguste Fouquet, duc de Belle-Isle, 1749–1761, politician and soldier
 Nicolas-Charles-Joseph Trublet, 1761–1770, ecclesiastic
 Jean François de Saint-Lambert, 1770–1793, poet and philosopher
 Hugues-Bernard Maret, duc de Bassano, 1803–1815, politician and diplomat
 Joseph Lainé, 1816–1835, politician and magistrate
 Emmanuel Dupaty, 1836–1851, poet and playwright
 Alfred de Musset, 1852–1857, playwright and poet
 Victor de Laprade, 1858–1883, poet
 François Coppée, 1884–1908, poet and novelist
 Jean Aicard, 1909–1921, poet and novelist
 Camille Jullian, 1924–1933, historian and philologist
 Léon Bérard, 1934–1960, politician and lawyer
 Jean Guitton, 1961–1999, theologian and philosopher
 Florence Delay, elected 2000, novelist and playwright

Seat 11
 Philippe Habert, 1634–1638, poet
 Jacques Esprit, 1639–1678, politician
 Jacques-Nicolas Colbert, 1678–1707, ecclesiastic
 Claude-François Fraguier, 1707–1728, ecclesiastic
 Charles d'Orléans de Rothelin, 1728–1744, ecclesiastic
 Gabriel Girard, 1744–1748, ecclesiastic
 Marc-Antoine-René de Voyer d'Argenson de Paulmy, 1748–1787, politician
 Henri-Cardin-Jean-Baptiste d'Aguesseau, 1787–1826, politician
 Charles Brifaut, 1826–1857, poet and playwright
 Jules Sandeau, 1858–1883, novelist and playwright
 Edmond François Valentin About, 1884–1885, novelist and playwright
 Léon Say, 1886–1896, politician and economist
 Albert Vandal, 1896–1910, historian
 Denys Cochin, 1911–1922, politician
 Georges Goyau, 1922–1939, historian
 Paul Hazard, 1940–1944, historian and philosopher
 Maurice Garçon, 1946–1967, lawyer, novelist and historian
 Paul Morand, 1968–1976, diplomat, novelist, playwright and poet
 Alain Peyrefitte, 1977–1999, scholar and politician
 Gabriel de Broglie, elected 2001, historian

Seat 12
 Germain Habert, 1634–1654, ecclesiastic
 Charles Cotin, 1655–1681, ecclesiastic
 Louis de Courcillon, 1682–1723, ecclesiastic and politician
 Charles Jean-Baptiste Fleuriau, 1723–1732, politician
 Jean Terrasson, 1732–1750, ecclesiastic and philosopher
 Claude de Thiard de Bissy, 1750–1810, soldier
 Joseph-Alphonse Esménard, 1810–1811, politician
 Jean Charles Dominique de Lacretelle, 1811–1855, historian
 Jean-Baptiste Biot, 1856–1862, scientist and mathematician
 Louis de Carné, 1863–1876, historian and politician
 Charles Blanc, 1876–1882, art critic
 Édouard Pailleron, 1882–1899, poet and playwright
 Paul Hervieu, 1900–1915, novelist and playwright
 François, Vicomte de Curel, 1918–1928, playwright
 Charles Le Goffic, 1930–1932, novelist and historian
 Abel Bonnard, 1932–1945, poet, novelist and politician; expelled for his collaboration with Vichy regime
 Jules Romains, 1946–1972, novelist, playwright and poet
 Jean d'Ormesson, 1973–2017, novelist
 Chantal Thomas, elected 2021, writer and historian

Seat 13
 Claude Gaspard Bachet de Méziriac, 1634–1638, grammarian and mathematician
 François de La Mothe Le Vayer, 1639–1672, critic, grammarian and philosopher
 Jean Racine, 1672–1699, playwright, mathematician, physicist and doctor
 Jean-Baptiste-Henri de Valincour, 1699–1730, historiographer and admiral
 Jean-François Leriget de La Faye, 1730–1731, politician
 Prosper Jolyot de Crébillon, 1731–1762, playwright
 Claude-Henri de Fusée de Voisenon, 1762–1775, ecclesiastic, playwright and poet
 Jean de Dieu-Raymond de Cucé de Boisgelin, 1776–1804, ecclesiastic
 Jean-Baptiste Dureau de la Malle, 1804–1807, translator
 Louis-Benoît Picard, 1807–1828, comedian, poet, novelist and playwright
 Antoine-Vincent Arnault, 1829–1834, poet, fabulist and playwright 
 Eugène Scribe, 1834–1861, playwright
 Octave Feuillet, 1862–1890, novelist and playwright
 Pierre Loti, 1891–1923, novelist and soldier
 Paul-Albert Besnard, 1924–1934, painter and engraver
 Louis Gillet, 1935–1943, historian of art and literature
 Paul Claudel, 1946–1955, poet, playwright, novelist and diplomat
 Wladimir d'Ormesson, 1956–1973, politician, chronicler and novelist
 Maurice Schumann, 1974–1998, politician, essayist, journalist, novelist and historian
 Pierre Messmer, 1999–2007, soldier and politician
 Simone Veil, 2008–2017, lawyer and politician
 Maurizio Serra, elected 2020, writer and diplomat

Seat 14
 François Maynard, 1634–1646, magistrate and poet
 Pierre Corneille, 1647–1684, playwright and lawyer
 Thomas Corneille, 1684–1709, playwright
 Antoine Houdar de la Motte, 1710–1731, playwright
 Michel-Celse-Roger de Bussy-Rabutin, 1732–1736, ecclesiastic
 Étienne Lauréault de Foncemagne, 1736–1779, ecclesiastic
 Michel Paul Guy de Chabanon, 1779–1792, playwright
 Jacques-André Naigeon, 1803–1810, encyclopaedist
 Népomucène Lemercier, 1810–1840, poet and playwright
 Victor Hugo, 1841–1885, poet, playwright and novelist
 Leconte de Lisle, 1886–1894, poet and playwright
 Henry Houssaye, 1894–1911, historian and novelist
 Hubert Lyautey, 1912–1934, soldier
 Louis Franchet d'Espèrey, 1934–1942, politician and soldier
 Robert d'Harcourt, 1946–1965, literary historian and essayist
 Jean Mistler, 1966–1988, novelist, essayist, literary historian, music critic and politician
 Hélène Carrère d'Encausse, elected 1990, historian

Seat 15
 Guillaume Bautru, 1634–1665, politician
 Jacques Testu de Belval, 1665–1706, ecclesiastic and poet
 François-Joseph de Beaupoil de Sainte-Aulaire, 1706–1742, soldier and poet
 Jean-Jacques d'Ortous de Mairan, 1743–1771, physicist and mathematician
 François Arnaud, 1771–1784, ecclesiastic
 Gui-Jean-Baptiste Target, 1785–1806, magistrate
 Jean-Sifrein Maury, 1806-excluded by ordinance 1816, ecclesiastic and politician 
 François-Xavier-Marc-Antoine de Montesquiou-Fézensac, 1816–1832, ecclesiastic and politician
 Antoine Jay, 1832–1854, politician
 Ustazade Silvestre de Sacy, 1854–1879, literary critic
 Eugène Marin Labiche, 1880–1888, playwright and novelist
 Henri Meilhac, 1888–1897, playwright
 Henri Lavedan, 1898–1940, playwright and novelist
 Ernest Seillière, 1946–1955, historian of literature and of philosophy, and essayist
 André Chamson, 1956–1983, novelist, essayist and historian
 Fernand Braudel, 1984–1985, historian of civilisations
 Jacques Laurent, 1986–2000, novelist, essayist and journalist
 Frédéric Vitoux, elected 2001, writer and journalist

Seat 16
 Jean Sirmond, 1634–1649, historiographer
 Jean de Montereul, 1649–1651, ecclesiastic
 François Tallemant l'Aîné, 1651–1693, ecclesiastic
 Simon de la Loubère, 1693–1729, diplomat and poet
 Claude Sallier, 1729–1761, ecclesiastic and philologist
 Jean-Gilles du Coëtlosquet, 1761–1784, ecclesiastic
 Anne-Pierre, marquis de Montesquiou-Fézensac, 1784–1793, politician
 Antoine-Vincent Arnault, 1803, excluded by ordinance 1816, re-elected in 1829 to seat 13, poet, fabulist and playwright
 Armand-Emmanuel de Vignerot du Plessis, Duc de Richelieu, 1816–1822, politician
 Bon-Joseph Dacier, 1822–1833, philologist
 Pierre François Tissot, 1833–1854, poet and historian
 Félix Dupanloup, 1854–1878, ecclesiastic
 Gaston Audiffret-Pasquier, 1878–1905, politician
 Alexandre Ribot, 1906–1923, politician, lawyer, magistrate and jurist
 Henri-Robert, 1923–1936, lawyer and historian
 Charles Maurras, 1938, not excluded, but seat "declared vacant" for Vichy collaboration in 1945, journalist, politician, essayist and poet
 Antoine de Lévis Mirepoix, 1953–1981, novelist, historian and essayist
 Léopold Sédar Senghor, 1983–2001, head of state (Senegal), politician, poet and essayist
 Valéry Giscard d'Estaing, 2003–2020, former president of France

Seat 17
 François de Cauvigny de Colomby, 1634–1649, poet
 François Tristan l'Hermite, 1649–1655, playwright and poet
 Hippolyte-Jules Pilet de La Mesnardière, 1655–1663, critic, poet and historian
 François de Beauvilliers, 1st duc de Saint-Aignan, 1663–1687, soldier
 François-Timoléon de Choisy, 1687–1724, ecclesiastic
 Antoine Portail, 1724–1736, politician
 Pierre-Claude Nivelle de La Chaussée, 1736–1754, playwright
 Jean-Pierre de Bougainville, 1754–1763, historian
 Jean-François Marmontel, 1763–1793, philosopher and essayist
 Louis-Marcelin de Fontanes, 1803–1821, politician, poet and journalist
 Abel-François Villemain, 1821–1870, politician and literary critic
 Émile Littré, 1871–1881, philologist and philosopher
 Louis Pasteur, 1881–1895, chemist
 Gaston Paris, 1896–1903, philologist and literary historian
 Frédéric Masson, 1903–1923, historian
 Georges Lecomte, 1924–1958, novelist, essayist, art critic and historian
 Jean Delay, 1959–1987, psychiatrist, essayist and novelist
 Jacques Cousteau, 1988–1997, oceanographer, film-maker and essayist
 Érik Orsenna, elected 1998, politician and novelist

Seat 18
 Jean Baudoin, 1634–1650, translator
 François Charpentier, 1650–1702, novelist
 Jean-François de Chamillart, 1702–1714, ecclesiastic
 Claude Louis Hector de Villars, 1714–1734, politician and soldier
 Honoré Armand de Villars, 1734–1770, politician
 Étienne Charles de Loménie de Brienne, 1770–1794, ecclesiastic, politician and philosopher
 Jean-Gérard Lacuée, count of Cessac, 1803–1841, politician
 Alexis de Tocqueville, 1841–1859, politician
 Jean-Baptiste Henri Lacordaire, 1860–1861, ecclesiastic
 Albert, 4th duc de Broglie, 1862–1901, politician, diplomat and historian
 Charles-Jean-Melchior de Vogüé, 1901–1916, archaeologist and historian
 Ferdinand Foch, 1918–1929, soldier
 Philippe Pétain, 1929–1945, soldier (expelled from the Academy after trial; in 1945-1952 the seat was vacant)
 André François-Poncet, 1952–1978, politician and diplomat
 Edgar Faure, 1978–1988, politician and historian
 Michel Serres, 1990–2019, philosopher
 Mario Vargas Llosa, elected 2021, novelist and essayist

Seat 19
 François de Porchères d'Arbaud, 1634–1640, poet
 Olivier Patru, 1640–1681, lawyer
 Nicolas Potier de Novion, 1681–1693, magistrate
 Philippe Goibaud-Dubois, 1693–1694, translator
 Charles Boileau, 1694–1704, ecclesiastic
 Gaspard Abeille, 1704–1718, ecclesiastic
 Nicolas-Hubert de Mongault, 1718–1746, ecclesiastic
 Charles Pinot Duclos, 1746–1772, grammarian and historian
 Nicolas Beauzée, 1772–1789, grammarian
 Jean-Jacques Barthélemy, 1789–1795, ecclesiastic
 Joseph Chénier, 1803–1811, poet and playwright
 François-René de Chateaubriand, 1811–1848, politician, poet and novelist
 Paul, 6th duc de Noailles, 1849–1885, historian
 Édouard Hervé, 1886–1899, politician
 Paul Deschanel, 1899–1922, politician
 Auguste Jonnart, 1923–1927, politician, senior bureaucrat and diplomat
 Maurice Paléologue, 1928–1944, diplomat and historian
 Charles de Chambrun, 1946–1952, diplomat
 Fernand Gregh, 1953–1960, poet, literary critic and historian
 René Clair, 1960–1981, film director and novelist
 Pierre Moinot, 1982–2007, senior bureaucrat and novelist
 Jean-Loup Dabadie, 2008–2020, journalist, lyricist and screenwriter

Seat 20
 Paul Hay du Chastelet, 1634–1636, lawyer
 Nicolas Perrot d'Ablancourt, 1637–1664, translator
 Roger de Rabutin, Comte de Bussy, 1665–1693, novelist
 Jean-Paul Bignon, 1693–1743, ecclesiastic
 Armand-Jérôme Bignon, 1743–1772, politician
 Louis-Georges de Bréquigny, 1772–1795, historian
 Ponce Denis Écouchard Lebrun, 1803–1807, poet
 François Juste Marie Raynouard, 1807–1836, lawyer, poet and playwright
 François Mignet, 1836–1884, historian
 Victor Duruy, 1884–1894, politician and historian
 Jules Lemaître, 1895–1914, playwright and critic
 Henry Bordeaux, 1919–1963, lawyer and novelist
 Thierry Maulnier, 1964–1988, journalist and playwright
 José Cabanis, 1990–2000, magistrate and novelist
 Angelo Rinaldi, elected 2001, writer

Seat 21
 Marin le Roy de Gomberville, 1634–1674, novelist
 Pierre Daniel Huet, 1674–1721, ecclesiastic
 Jean Boivin le Cadet, 1721–1726, professor
 Paul-Hippolyte de Beauvilliers, duke of Saint-Aignan, 1726–1776, politician
 Charles-Pierre Colardeau, 1776, poet and playwright
 Jean-François de La Harpe, 1776–1793, poet, playwright and critic
 Pierre Louis de Lacretelle, 1803–1824, lawyer
 Joseph Droz, 1824–1850, philosopher and historian
 Charles Forbes René de Montalembert, 1851–1870, philosopher
 Henri d'Orleans, duke of Aumale, 1871–1897, soldier, politician and historian
 Jean-Baptiste Claude Eugène Guillaume, 1898–1905, sculptor
 Étienne Lamy, 1905–1919, essayist, politician and lawyer
 André Chevrillon, 1920–1957, essayist and literary historian and critic
 Marcel Achard, 1959–1974, playwright and journalist
 Félicien Marceau, 1975–2012, playwright, novelist and essayist
 Alain Finkielkraut, elected 2014, philosopher and essayist

Seat 22
 Antoine Girard de Saint-Amant, 1634–1661, poet
 Jacques Cassagne, 1662–1679, ecclesiastic and poet
 Louis de Verjus, 1679–1709, politician
 Jean-Antoine de Mesmes, 1710–1723, magistrate
 Pierre-Joseph Alary, 1723–1770, ecclesiastic
 Gabriel-Henri Gaillard, 1771–1806, ecclesiastic, historian, grammarian and journalist
 Louis Philippe, comte de Ségur, 1806–1830, diplomat, historian, poet and playwright
 Jean-Pons-Guillaume Viennet, 1830–1868, politician, poet and playwright
 Joseph d'Haussonville, 1869–1884, politician and diplomat
 Ludovic Halévy, 1884–1908, playwright, librettist and novelist
 Eugène Brieux, 1909–1932, playwright
 François Mauriac, 1933–1970, writer, essayist and literary critic
 Julien Green, 1971–1998, novelist and playwright
 René de Obaldia, 1999–2022, playwright and poet

Seat 23
 Guillaume Colletet, 1634–1659, lawyer and playwright
 Gilles Boileau, 1659–1669, poet
 Jean de Montigny, 1670–1671, ecclesiastic and poet
 Charles Perrault, 1671–1703, poet
 Armand Gaston Maximilien de Rohan, 1703–1749, ecclesiastic and politician
 Louis-Gui de Guérapin de Vauréal, 1749–1760, ecclesiastic and politician
 Charles Marie de La Condamine, 1760–1774, explorer
 Jacques Delille, 1774–1813, ecclesiastic and poet
 François-Nicolas-Vincent Campenon, 1813–1843, poet
 Marc Girardin, 1844–1873, politician and literary critic
 Alfred Mézières, 1874–1915, literary historian, politician and essayist
 René Boylesve, 1918–1926, novelist and poet
 Abel Hermant, 1927–1945, novelist, essayist and journalist
 Étienne Gilson, 1946–1978, philosopher
 Henri Gouhier, 1979–1994, philosopher and literary critic
 Pierre Rosenberg, elected 1995, art historian and essayist

Seat 24
 Jean de Silhon, 1634–1667, politician
 Jean-Baptiste Colbert, 1667–1683, politician
 Jean de La Fontaine, 1684–1695, poet
 Jules de Clérambault, 1695–1714, ecclesiastic
 Guillaume Massieu, 1714–1722, ecclesiastic
 Claude-François-Alexandre Houtteville, 1722–1742, ecclesiastic
 Pierre de Marivaux, 1742–1763, playwright and novelist
 Claude-François Lysarde de Radonvilliers, 1763–1789, ecclesiastic
 Constantin-François Chassebœuf, 1803–1820, philosopher
 Claude-Emmanuel de Pastoret, 1820–1840, politician, lawyer and poet
 Louis de Beaupoil de Saint-Aulaire, 1841–1854, politician
 Victor de Broglie, 1855–1870, politician
 Prosper Duvergier de Hauranne, 1870–1881, politician
 Sully Prudhomme, 1881–1907, poet and essayist
 Henri Poincaré, 1908–1912, mathematician, astronomer, engineer and philosopher
 Alfred Capus, 1914–1922, playwright, journalist and essayist
 Édouard Estaunié, 1923–1942, novelist and engineer
 Louis-Pasteur Vallery-Radot, 1944–1970, doctor
 Étienne Wolff, 1971–1996, biologist
 Jean-François Revel, 1997–2006, historian and essayist
 Max Gallo, 2007–2017, journalist and novelist
 François Sureau, elected 2020, writer

Seat 25
Claude de L'Estoile, 1634–1652, playwright and poet
Armand de Camboust, duc de Coislin, 1652–1702, soldier
Pierre de Camboust, duc de Coislin, 1702–1710, aristocrat
Henri Charles du Cambout de Coislin, 1710–1732, ecclesiastic
Jean-Baptiste Surian, 1733–1754, ecclesiastic
Jean Le Rond, dit d'Alembert, 1754–1783, philosopher and mathematician
Marie-Gabriel-Florent-Auguste de Choiseul-Gouffier, 1783–1793, biographer
Jean-Étienne-Marie Portalis, 1803–1807, politician, philosopher and lawyer
Pierre Laujon, 1807–1811, poet and songwriter
 Charles-Guillaume Étienne, 1811–1816, poet and playwright, excluded by ordinance 
Marie-Gabriel-Florent-Auguste de Choiseul-Gouffier, (2nd time), 1816–1817
Jean-Louis Laya, 1817–1833, poet and playwright
Charles Nodier, 1833–1844, novelist, poet and grammarian
Prosper Mérimée, 1844–1870, novelist
Louis de Loménie, 1871–1878, essayist
Hippolyte Taine, 1878–1893, essayist and historian
Albert Sorel, 1894–1906, historian
Maurice Donnay, 1907–1945, playwright
Marcel Pagnol, 1946–1974, playwright, film-maker and novelist
 Jean Bernard, 1976–2006, medical doctor
Dominique Fernandez, elected 2007, novelist and literary critic

Seat 26
 Amable de Bourzeys, 1634–1672, ecclesiastic and scholar
 Jean Gallois, 1672–1707, ecclesiastic
 Edme Mongin, 1707–1746, ecclesiastic
 Jean Ignace de La Ville, 1746–1774, ecclesiastic and diplomat
 Jean-Baptiste-Antoine Suard, 1774–1817, essayist
 Jean-François Roger, 1817–1842, poet and playwright
 Henri Patin, 1842–1876, professor
 Marie-Louis-Antoine-Gaston Boissier, 1876–1908, historian and philologist
 René Doumic, 1909–1937, literary historian and critic, and essayist
 André Maurois, 1938–1967, novelist, essayist, literary historian and critic
 Marcel Arland, 1968–1986, novelist, essayist, literary historian and critic
 Georges Duby, 1987–1996, historian
 Jean-Marie Rouart, elected 1997, novelist and essayist

Seat 27
 Abel Servien, 1634–1659, politician
 Jean-Jacques Renouard de Villayer, 1659–1691, politician
 Bernard le Bovier de Fontenelle, 1691–1757, playwright and philosopher
 Antoine-Louis Séguier, 1757–1792, lawyer
 Jacques-Henri Bernardin de Saint-Pierre, 1803–1814, essayist
 Étienne Aignan, 1814–1824, journalist and playwright
 Alexandre Soumet, 1824–1845, poet and playwright
 Ludovic Vitet, 1845–1873, archaeologist
 Elme Marie Caro, 1874–1887, philosopher
 Gabriel Paul Othenin de Cléron, comte d'Haussonville, 1888–1924, politician and lawyer
 Auguste-Armand de la Force, 1925–1961 historian
 Joseph Kessel, 1962–1979, journalist and novelist
 Michel Droit, 1980–2001, novelist
 Pierre Nora, elected 2001, historian

Seat 28
 Jean-Louis Guez de Balzac, 1634–1654, essayist
 Paul Hardouin de Péréfixe de Beaumont, 1654–1670, ecclesiastic and historian
 François de Harlay de Champvallon, 1671–1695, ecclesiastic
 André Dacier, 1695–1722, philologist and translator
 Guillaume Dubois, 1722–1723, ecclesiastic and politician
 Charles-Jean-François Hénault, 1723–1770, magistrate
 Charles Juste de Beauvau, 1771–1793, politician and soldier
 Philippe-Antoine Merlin de Douai, 1803–1815, politician and lawyer; removed by ordinance
 Antoine-François-Claude Ferrand, 1816–1825, magistrate, poet, historian and playwright
 Casimir Delavigne, 1825–1843, poet and playwright
 Charles Augustin Sainte-Beuve, 1844–1869, essayist and poet
 Jules Janin, 1870–1874, novelist and critic
 John Lemoinne, 1875–1892, diplomat and journalist
 Ferdinand Brunetière, 1893–1906, literary critic, historian of literature and essayist
 Henri Barboux, 1907–1910, lawyer
 Henry Roujon, 1911–1914, senior bureaucrat, essayist and novelist
 Louis Barthou, 1918–1934, politician, magistrate, historian and historian of literature; assassinated
 Claude Farrère, 1935–1957, novelist, essayist and historian
 Henri Troyat, 1959–2007, novelist, historian of literature, historian
 Jean-Christophe Rufin, elected 2008, physician and novelist

Seat 29
 Pierre Bardin, 1634–1635, philosopher and mathematician
 Nicolas Bourbon, 1637–1644, ecclesiastic
 François-Henri Salomon de Virelade, 1644–1670, lawyer
 Philippe Quinault, 1670–1688, poet and playwright
 François de Callières, 1688–1717, philologist
 André-Hercule de Fleury, 1717–1743, ecclesiastic and politician
 Paul d'Albert de Luynes, 1743–1788, ecclesiastic
 Jean-Pierre Claris de Florian, 1788–1794, playwright, novelist and poet
 Jean-François Cailhava de L'Estandoux, 1803–1813, playwright, poet and critic
 Joseph Michaud, 1813–1839, journalist and historian
 Jean Pierre Flourens, 1840–1867, physiologist
 Claude Bernard, 1868–1878, doctor
 Ernest Renan, 1878–1892, philosopher
 Paul-Armand Challemel-Lacour, 1893–1896, politician and diplomat
 Gabriel Hanotaux, 1897–1944, politician, diplomat and historian
 André Siegfried, 1944–1959, historian and geographer
 Henry de Montherlant, 1960–1972, playwright, novelist and essayist
 Claude Lévi-Strauss, 1973–2009, anthropologist
 Amin Maalouf, elected 2011, novelist

Seat 30
 Honorat de Bueil, seigneur de Racan, 1634–1670, poet
 François-Séraphin Régnier-Desmarais, 1670–1713, ecclesiastic and grammarian
 Bernard de la Monnoye, 1713–1728, philologist and critic
 Michel Poncet de La Rivière, 1728–1730, ecclesiastic
 Jacques Hardion. 1730–1766, historian
 Antoine Léonard Thomas, 1766–1785, poet
 Jacques Antoine Hippolyte, Comte de Guibert, 1785–1790, playwright
 Jean Jacques Régis de Cambacérès, 1803- excluded by ordinance 1816, politician; died 1824
 Louis Gabriel Ambroise de Bonald, 1816–1840, philosopher and publicist
 Jacques-François Ancelot, 1841–1854, poet, novelist and playwright
 Ernest Legouvé, 1855–1903, poet, novelist, playwright and essayist
 René Bazin, 1903–1932, novelist and essayist
 Théodore Gosselin, 1932–1935, historian who wrote under the pen name of G. Lenotre
 Georges Duhamel, 1935–1966, doctor, essayist, novelist, poet and playwright
 Maurice Druon, 1966–2009, politician and novelist
 Danièle Sallenave, elected 2011, novelist and journalist

Seat 31
 Pierre de Boissat, 1634–1662, soldier
 Antoine Furetière, 1662–1685, poet, fabulist and novelist; excluded but not replaced, died in 1688
 Jean de La Chapelle, 1688–1723, poet
 Pierre-Joseph Thoulier d'Olivet, 1723–1768, ecclesiastic and grammarian
 Étienne Bonnot de Condillac, 1768–1780, ecclesiastic and philosopher
 Louis-Élisabeth de La Vergne de Tressan, 1780–1783, poet and physicist
 Jean Sylvain Bailly, 1783–1793, mathematician; guillotined
 Emmanuel Joseph Sieyès, 1803–1816, ecclesiastic, essayist and diplomat; excluded by ordinance, died 1836
 Gérard de Lally-Tollendal, 1816–1830, politician
 Jean-Baptiste Sanson de Pongerville, 1830–1870, poet
 Xavier Marmier, 1870–1892, novelist and poet
 Henri de Bornier, 1893–1901, playwright and poet
 Edmond Rostand, 1901–1918, playwright and poet
 Joseph Bédier, 1920–1938, philologist
 Jérôme Tharaud, 1938–1953, novelist
 Jean Cocteau, 1955–1963, playwright, poet, choreographer, filmmaker and painter
 Jacques Rueff, 1964–1978, economist and high bureaucrat
 Jean Dutourd, 1978–2011, novelist
 Michael Edwards, elected 2013, literary scholar

Seat 32
 Claude Favre de Vaugelas, 1634–1650, grammarian
 Georges de Scudéry, 1650–1667, novelist, playwright and poet
 Philippe de Courcillon, 1667–1720, soldier, governor and diplomat
 Armand de Vignerot du Plessis, 1720–1788, soldier, libertine and politician
 François-Henri d'Harcourt, 1788–1802, soldier
 Lucien Bonaparte, 1803–1816, politician. Excluded by ordinance.
 Louis-Simon Auger, 1816–1829, journalist and playwright
 Charles-Guillaume Étienne, 1829–1845, poet and playwright 
 Alfred de Vigny, 1845–1863, poet
 Camille Doucet, 1865–1895, poet and playwright
 Charles Costa de Beauregard, 1896–1909, historian and politician
 Hippolyte Langlois, 1911–1912, soldier
 Émile Boutroux, 1912–1921, philosopher and historian of philosophy
 Pierre de Nolhac, 1922–1936, historian, art historian and poet
 Georges-François-Xavier-Marie Grente, 1936–1959, ecclesiastic, historian and essayist
 Henri Massis, 1960–1970, essayist, literary critic and literary historian
 Georges Izard, 1971–1973, politician, lawyer, journalist and essayist
 Robert Aron, 1974–1975, historian and essayist
 Maurice Rheims, 1976–2003, novelist and art historian
 Alain Robbe-Grillet, 2004–2008, novelist and filmmaker
 François Weyergans, 2009–2019, novelist and filmmaker
 Pascal Ory, elected 2021, historian

Seat 33
 Vincent Voiture, 1634–1648, poet
 François Eudes de Mézeray, 1648–1683, lawyer
 Jean Barbier d'Aucour, 1683–1694, lawyer
 François de Clermont-Tonnerre, 1694–1701, ecclesiastic
 Nicolas de Malézieu, 1701–1727, tutor and poet
 Jean Bouhier, 1727–1746, magistrate and archaeologist
 François-Marie Arouet dit Voltaire, 1746–1778, playwright, historian, philosopher and poet
 Jean-François Ducis, 1778–1816, poet and playwright
 Raymond Desèze, 1816–1828, lawyer
 Amable Guillaume Prosper Brugière, baron de Barante, 1828–1866, politician
 Auguste Joseph Alphonse Gratry, 1867–1872, ecclesiastic and philosopher
 René Taillandier, 1873–1879, politician
 Maxime Du Camp, 1880–1894, essayist and novelist
 Paul Bourget, 1894–1935, novelist, poet and playwright
 Edmond Jaloux, 1936–1949, novelist, literary critic and literary historian
 Jean-Louis Vaudoyer, 1950–1963, novelist, poet, essayist and art historian
 Marcel Brion, 1964–1984, novelist, art historian and essayist
 Michel Mohrt, 1985–2011, editor, essayist, novelist and literary historian
 Dominique Bona, elected 2013, novelist

Seat 34
 Honorat de Porchères Laugier, 1634–1653, poet
 Paul Pellisson, 1653–1693, historian
 François de Salignac de La Mothe Fénelon, 1693–1715, ecclesiastic and essayist
 Claude Gros de Boze, 1715–1753, erudite and numismatist
 Louis de Bourbon Condé de Clermont, 1753–1771, ecclesiastic
 Pierre-Laurent Buirette de Belloy, 1771–1775, playwright and actor
 Emmanuel-Félicité de Durfort de Duras, 1775–1789, politician and soldier
 Dominique Joseph Garat, 1803–1816, politician, lawyer and philosopher. Excluded by ordinance, he refused readmission in 1829, died 1833
 Louis-François de Bausset, 1816–1824, ecclesiastic and politician
 Hyacinthe-Louis de Quélen, 1824–1839, ecclesiastic
 Louis-Mathieu Molé, 1840–1855, politician
 Frédéric Alfred Pierre, comte de Falloux, 1856–1886, politician and historian
 Octave Gréard, 1886–1904, high bureaucrat, literary historian and literary critic
 Émile Gebhart, 1904–1908, art historian, literary historian and literary critic
 Raymond Poincaré, 1909–1934, head of state, politician, lawyer and essayist
 Jacques Bainville, 1935–1936, historian and journalist
 Joseph de Pesquidoux, 1936–1946, novelist and essayist
 Maurice Genevoix, 1946–1980, novelist
 Jacques de Bourbon-Busset, 1981–2001, politician, essayist and novelist
 François Cheng, elected 2002, poet, translator and novelist

Seat 35
 Henri Louis Habert de Montmor, 1634–1679, hotel-keeper
 Louis de Lavau, 1679–1694, ecclesiastic
 François Lefebvre de Caumartin, 1694–1733, ecclesiastic
 François-Augustin de Paradis de Moncrif, 1733–1770, poet, musician and playwright
 Jean-Armand de Bessuéjouls Roquelaure, 1771–1818, ecclesiastic
 Georges Cuvier, 1818–1832, palaeontologist
 André Marie Jean Jacques Dupin, 1832–1865, politician and lawyer
 Alfred-Auguste Cuvillier-Fleury, 1866–1887, historian and literary critic
 Jules Arsène Arnaud Claretie, 1888–1913, novelist, playwright and critic
 Joseph Joffre, 1918–1931, politician and soldier
 Maxime Weygand, 1931–1965, soldier
 Louis Leprince-Ringuet, 1966–2000, physicist, telecommunications engineer, historian of science and essayist
 Yves Pouliquen, 2001–2020, medical doctor
 Antoine Compagnon, elected 2022, academic

Seat 36
 Marin Cureau de la Chambre, 1634–1669, medical doctor and philosopher
 Pierre Cureau de La Chambre, 1670–1693, ecclesiastic
 Jean de La Bruyère, 1693–1696, essayist and moralist
 Claude Fleury, 1696–1723, ecclesiastic
 Jacques Adam, 1723–1735, philologist
 Joseph Séguy, 1736–1761, ecclesiastic
 Louis René Édouard, cardinal de Rohan, 1761–1793, ecclesiastic, politician, philosopher and poet
 Jean Devaines, 1803, state bureaucrat
 Évariste de Parny, 1803–1814, poet
 Victor-Joseph Étienne de Jouy, 1815–1846, journalist, critic and playwright
 Adolphe-Simonis Empis, 1847–1868, poet and playwright
 Henri Auguste Barbier, 1869–1882, poet
 Adolphe Perraud, 1882–1906, ecclesiastic
 François-Désiré Mathieu, 1906–1908, ecclesiastic and historian
 Louis Duchesne, 1910–1922, ecclesiastic, historian and philologist
 Henri Brémond, 1923–1933, ecclesiastic, literary historian and literary critic
 André Bellessort, 1935–1942, essayist, literary critic, historian and historian of literature
 René Grousset, 1946–1952, art historian
 Pierre Gaxotte, 1953–1982, historian and journalist
 Jacques Soustelle, 1983–1990, Americanist, ethnologist, politician and essayist
 Jean-François Deniau, 1990–2007, politician, essayist and novelist
 Philippe Beaussant, 2007–2016, musicologist and novelist
 Barbara Cassin, 2018–present, philologist and philosopher

Seat 37
 Daniel Hay du Chastelet de Chambon, 1635–1671, ecclesiastic and mathematician
 Jacques-Bénigne Bossuet, 1671–1704, ecclesiastic and historian
 Melchior de Polignac, 1704–1741, ecclesiastic, politician, philologist and poet
 Odet-Joseph Giry, 1741–1761, ecclesiastic
 Charles Batteux, 1761–1780, ecclesiastic
 Antoine-Marin Lemierre, 1780–1793, poet and playwright
 Félix-Julien-Jean Bigot de Préameneu, 1803–1825, politician and lawyer
 Mathieu de Montmorency, 1825–1826, politician and diplomat
 Alexandre Guiraud, 1826–1847, playwright, poet and novelist
 Jean-Jacques Ampère, 1847–1864, historian of literature
 Lucien-Anatole Prévost-Paradol, 1865–1870, literary critic
 Camille Rousset, 1871–1892, historian
 Paul Thureau-Dangin, 1893–1913, historian
 Pierre de La Gorce, 1914–1934, historian, magistrate and lawyer
 Maurice, 6th duc de Broglie, 1934–1960, sailor and physicist
 Eugène Tisserant, 1961–1972, ecclesiastic and philologist
 Jean Daniélou, 1972–1974, ecclesiastic, theologian, historian and essayist
 Ambroise-Marie Carré, 1975–2004, ecclesiastic
 René Girard, 2005–2015, philosopher, literary critic
 Michel Zink, elected 2017, medievalist, philologist and novelist

Seat 38
 Auger de Moléon de Granier, 1635–1636, possibly an ecclesiastic; expelled for theft; died 1650
 Balthazar Baro, 1636–1650, playwright and poet
 Jean Doujat, 1650–1688, lawyer
 Eusèbe Renaudot, 1688–1720, ecclesiastic
 Henri-Emmanuel de Roquette, 1720–1725, ecclesiastic
 Pierre de Pardaillan de Gondrin, 1725–1733, ecclesiastic
 Nicolas-François Dupré de Saint-Maur, 1733–1774, economist and statistician
 Guillaume-Chrétien de Lamoignon de Malesherbes, 1775–1794, politician and magistrate; guillotined
 François Andrieux, 1803–1833, lawyer, poet and playwright
 Adolphe Thiers, 1833–1877, politician and historian
 Henri Martin, 1878–1883, historian
 Ferdinand de Lesseps, 1884–1894, diplomat
 Anatole France, 1896–1924, novelist and poet
 Paul Valéry, 1925–1945, poet, literary critic and essayist
 Henri Mondor, 1946–1962, surgeon, physician, historian of literature and of science
 Louis Armand, 1963–1971, mining engineer, bureaucrat and economist
 Jean-Jacques Gautier, 1972–1986, drama critic, novelist, journalist and essayist
 Jean-Louis Curtis, 1986–1995, novelist and essayist
 François Jacob, 1996–2013, biologist
 Marc Lambron, elected 2014, literary critic and writer

Seat 39
 Louis Giry, 1636–1665, lawyer
 Claude Boyer, 1666–1698, ecclesiastic, playwright and poet
 Charles-Claude Genest, 1698–1719, ecclesiastic
 Jean-Baptiste Dubos, 1720–1742, ecclesiastic and historian
 Jean-François Du Bellay du Resnel, 1742–1761, ecclesiastic
 Bernard-Joseph Saurin, 1761–1781, lawyer and poet
 Jean-Antoine-Nicolas de Caritat, marquis de Condorcet, 1782–1794, philosopher and mathematician
 Gabriel Villar, 1803–1826, ecclesiastic
 Charles-Marie de Féletz, 1826–1850, ecclesiastic
 Désiré Nisard, 1850–1888, essayist
 Eugène-Melchior de Vogüé, 1888–1910, essayist, historian, literary critic and diplomat
 Henri de Régnier, 1911–1936, poet, novelist and essayist
 Jacques de Lacretelle, 1936–1985, novelist
 Bertrand Poirot-Delpech, 1986–2006, journalist, essayist and novelist
 Jean Clair, elected 2008, essayist and art historian

Seat 40
 Daniel de Priézac, 1639–1662, law professor
 Michel Le Clerc, 1662–1691, lawyer
 Jacques de Tourreil, 1692–1714, translator
 Jean-Roland Malet, 1714–1736, economist and royal valet de chambre
 Jean-François Boyer, 1736–1755, ecclesiastic
 Nicolas Thyrel de Boismont, 1755–1786, ecclesiastic
 Claude-Carloman de Rulhière, 1787–1791, diplomat, poet and historian
 Pierre Jean George Cabanis, 1803–1808, medical doctor and physiologist
 Antoine Destutt de Tracy, 1808–1836, philosopher
 François Guizot, 1836–1874, politician and historian
 Jean-Baptiste Dumas, 1875–1884, politician and chemist
 Joseph Louis François Bertrand, 1884–1900, mathematician, historian of science
 Marcellin Berthelot, 1900–1907, politician, chemist, essayist, historian of science
 Francis Charmes, 1908–1916, diplomat and journalist
 Jules Cambon, 1918–1935, diplomat, lawyer, senior civil servant
 Marie-Jean-Lucien Lacaze, 1936–1955, admiral
 Jacques Chastenet, 1956–1978, journalist, historian and diplomat
 Georges Dumézil, 1978–1986, philologist and historian of civilisations
 Pierre-Jean Rémy, 1988–2010, diplomat, novelist and essayist
 Xavier Darcos, elected 2013, politician, scholar and civil servant

Notes

References 

Académie française: Les immortels Official database of Members of the Académie française.

Académie française
 
Académie française